Kepler-371b (also known as KOI-2194.01, K02194.01, KIC 3548044 b) is a confirmed Super-Earth sized exoplanet. Orbiting around the F-type star Kepler-371 every 35 days about 2720 ly away from the Earth.

References

371b
b
Super-Earths
Exoplanets discovered in 2014

Cygnus (constellation)